Javier Iván Cazal Báez (born 22 March 1999) is a Paraguayan footballer who plays as a right midfielder or right-back for Lanús, on loan from Paraguayan Primera División side Club Sol de América.

Career

Early career
Cazal was raised in one of the poorest departments of Paraguay, San Pedro, in a little town called General Elizardo Aquino, 200 kilometers from the capital. Cazal started playing football at Club Teniente Turbo in Gral. Aquino, a local club placed next to his house, where he played with the seniors at the age of 14.

In 2015 he went to Deportivo Santaní training sessions, which that year achieved the historic promotion to the Paraguayan Primera División. Later, he had a spell at Club 8 De Diciembre San Pedro. Cazal was close to leaving football in 2017 to become a bricklayer because his family needed money. However, his father convinced him to stay and shortly after, Pedro Sarabia spotted him at Club 8 De Diciembre and offered him to join Deportivo Santaní again. Cazal accepted and returned to Santaní.

Deportivo Santaní
Soon after arriving, on 4 February 2018, Cazal got his professional debut against Club 3 de Febrero in the Paraguayan Primera División. His debut in the first division caused a furore, attracted the attention of clubs and he was even called up to the Paraguayan U-20 team and was in the U-20 micro circle for the Pre-Olympic Games.

Cazal quickly became a regular starter for Santaní and played 32 games and scored three goals for the team in the 2018 season, helping them to qualify for the 2019 Copa Sudamericana.

Whilst at Deportivo Santani, he credited teammate Eduardo Aranda for teaching and advising him.

In the 2019 season, Cazal played 43 games. However, he left the club at the end of that season, when Santaní was relegated to the Paraguayan División Intermedia.

Sol de América
At the end of December 2019 it was confirmed, that Cazal would join fellow league club Club Sol de América for the 2020 season. Cazal made his debut on 18 January 2020 against River Plate. He played a total of 24 game for the club in the 2019 season.

In January 2022, Cazal was offered to Primera División Argentina team San Lorenzo de Almagro by his agent Daniel Campo. In July 2022, he finally completed a move to Argentine football, as he signed a loan deal with Lanús until the end of 2023 with a purchase option.

References

External links
 
 
 

Living people
1999 births
Paraguayan footballers
Paraguayan expatriate footballers
Association football defenders
Association football midfielders
Paraguayan Primera División players
Argentine Primera División players
Deportivo Santaní players
Club Sol de América footballers
Club Atlético Lanús footballers
Paraguayan expatriate sportspeople in Argentina
Expatriate footballers in Argentina